Stephen "Steve" Hewitt (born 15 July 1958) is an Australian curler from Glen Waverley, Victoria.

At the international level, he is a four-time  curler (1991, 1993, 1994, 1996).

He played for Australia at the 1992 Winter Olympics where curling was a demonstration event. There, the Australian men's team finished in seventh place.

Hewitt only began curling in 1988.

Teams and events

References

External links

Living people
Australian male curlers
Curlers at the 1992 Winter Olympics

Pacific-Asian curling champions

1958 births
Sportspeople from Melbourne
Olympic curlers of Australia
People from Glen Waverley, Victoria
Sportsmen from Victoria (Australia)